N29 may refer to:
 , a submarine of the Royal Navy
 Jalan Terachi–Seri Menanti, a road in Malaysia
 London Buses route N29
 N29 road (Belgium), a National Road in Belgium
 N29 road (Ireland)
 Nebraska Highway 29, in the United States
 Route nationale 29